is a Japanese manga series written and illustrated by Shake-O. It follows the daily life and adventures of Hitomi Manaka, a cyclops who works as a school nurse, and her co-workers and students dealing with their human (and not-so-human) problems.

Nurse Hitomi's Monster Infirmary is published in Japan by Tokuma Shoten in their Monthly Comic Ryū magazine, and by Seven Seas Entertainment in North America.

Plot
In a world where certain individuals deal with unique and abnormal changes during puberty, Damoto Junior High's school nurse Hitomi Manaka does her best to help her patients work through their transition from insecurities to incidents like limbs that just will not stay attached and even shrinking spurts.

Characters

A cyclops and main heroine of the series who works as the school nurse, nicknamed . As a cyclops, and the eldest sibling in her family, despite her lack of depth perception, her eye allows her to observe any abnormalities in students to better help them.

 A plant-based being of unknown gender who serves as Hitomi's assistant, keeping a record of all students with abnormalities who visit the nurse's office.

 A 2nd year student from Class A whose tongue became elastic and grew to 320.5 cm in length, being the first of Hitomi's patients.

 
 Class B's teacher at the school, a kind-hearted gentleman despite being his initial imposing appearance due to fur covering his entire body.

Class A's teacher, he is a childhood friend of Hitomi's and their parents' houses are next door to each other. He has two extra arms growing from his torso.

 A winged girl and delinquent 2nd year student from Class B. She refuses to obey authority much of the time and is anti-social. She can fly, although it takes a lot out of her.

 Conjoined twin 2nd year students from Class D, Naruki being popular with the girls prior to Kaori appearing on his body. Kaori, identifying herself as female and initially a growth before becoming Naruki's right head, shares many of her brother's traits with admirers of her own.

Release
Shake-O began publishing the series in Tokuma Shoten's Monthly Comic Ryū magazine on 19 September 2013. The series moved to online-only serialization when Comic Ryū changed formats on 19 June 2018. Seven Seas Entertainment licensed the series for publication in North America.

The series has been collected into sixteen tankōbon volumes, of which thirteen have been published in English.

Reception
Lynzee Loveridge ranked the series at number five on her list of "7 Manga for Monster Girl Lovers" on Anime News Network.

References

External links
  at Monthly Comic Ryū 
  at Seven Seas Entertainment
 

Comedy anime and manga
Fantasy anime and manga
Fiction about size change
School life in anime and manga
Seinen manga
Seven Seas Entertainment titles
Slice of life anime and manga
Tokuma Shoten manga